Tuki may refer to:

People
 Jessica Tuki (born 1987), New Zealand netball player
 Lynn Rapu Tuki (born 1969)
 Marta Hotus Tuki,  Chilean politician
 Nabam Tuki (born 1964), Indian politician
 Valentino Riroroko Tuki (1932–2017), claimant to the Rapa Nui throne

Places
 Tüki, Estonia

Other
 Tuki or Ki language, spoken in Cameroon
 Solar Tuki